The Stožice Arena is a multi-purpose indoor arena located in Ljubljana, Slovenia. It was designed by Slovenian Sadar + Vuga architects and is the biggest indoor arena in the country. It lies in the Bežigrad district, north of the city centre. The arena is part of the Stožice Sports Park sports complex.

The arena is the home ground of basketball club KK Cedevita Olimpija.

History
The arena was named after the area in which it is located, and the change of the name is possible in the future due to sponsorship rights. Together with a football stadium it is part of the Stožice Sports Park. The arena building area measures 14,164 square meters. It was constructed in just 14 months and opened on 10 August 2010 with a basketball match between Slovenia and Spain, which was won by Spain 79–72 after overtime.

The arena has a capacity of 12,480 seats for basketball and is located in the north-western part of the park. The four levels of concourses and the lower, VIP and upper stands are covered by a shell-shaped dome. The arena is used for indoor sports such as basketball, handball and volleyball and is the home venue of KK Cedevita Olimpija. The arena is one of the main venues of Slovenian national team in most indoor sports except ice hockey for which the arena is not suitable and could only host if ice cooling machines would be implemented. Alongside the stadium the arena is also designed to host many cultural events.

Arena Stožice was one of the four venues of the 2022 European Women's Handball Championship, and will also co-host EuroBasket Women 2023.

Gallery

See also
 List of events held in the Stožice Arena
 List of indoor arenas in Slovenia

References

External links

Open day 30 June 2009

Indoor arenas in Slovenia
Basketball venues in Slovenia
Volleyball venues in Slovenia
Sports venues in Ljubljana
Bežigrad District
Sports venues completed in 2010
Handball venues in Slovenia
2010 establishments in Slovenia
KK Olimpija
KK Cedevita Olimpija
21st-century architecture in Slovenia